Robert Douglas Johnson (born August 19, 1946) is a former American football center who played 12 seasons with the Cincinnati Bengals, first in the American Football League (AFL), and then in the National Football League (NFL). He was the Bengals first ever draft selection when he was selected with the 2nd overall pick in the 1968 NFL/AFL draft.

College career
Johnson played college football at the University of Tennessee, where he was the first recruit of Tennessee coach Doug Dickey. He was named both All-Southeastern Conference (SEC) and All-American in 1966 and again in 1967. He earned the Jacobs Trophy, given to the SEC's best blocker, and he was named the SEC's Most Outstanding Lineman by the Birmingham Touchdown Club. Johnson finished sixth in the Heisman Trophy voting as a center.

Also in 1967, he was named an Academic All-American and was vice president of his class while earning a degree in industrial engineering.

In 1989, he was inducted into the College Football Hall of Fame.

Professional career
He was the first player chosen by the Bengals in their initial season. He was the second pick overall in the draft, preceded by future Hall of Famer Ron Yary. He was the second highest-drafted center ever selected in an NFL Draft, after Ki Aldrich in 1939.

He was an AFL All-Star in 1968.

Johnson was the last original Bengal to retire, after the 1978 season. His uniform number 54 was retired by the team, and remains the only number the team has retired. However, he came out of retirement in 1979 when Bengals center Blair Bush suffered a knee injury and the Bengals asked Johnson to return as a long snapper on punts, field goals and extra points.

Following his retirement as a player, Johnson worked as a color analyst on Bengals radio from 1981 to 1985. He also worked as a color analyst on some ESPN college football broadcasts in 1979 prior to his return to the Bengals.

References

External links
 
 

1946 births
Living people
American football centers
American Football League players
American football long snappers
Cincinnati Bengals announcers
Cincinnati Bengals players
National Football League announcers
Tennessee Volunteers football players
All-American college football players
American Football League All-Star players
American Football League first overall draft picks
College Football Hall of Fame inductees
National Football League players with retired numbers
Players of American football from Gary, Indiana
American Presbyterians